The Hoher Fricken ("High Fricken") is a mountain  high, in the Ester Mountains in the Bavarian Prealps and lies  between the Wank and the over 2000 m high Bischof. Below and to the north is the Niederer Fricken ("Low Fricken") and the Fricken Cirque (Frickenkar).
The summit may be reached as a mountain hike from Oberau or from the swimming pool in Farchant (via the path to the Esterbergalm) or rather more steeply from Farchant on a route going past the Kuhflucht Waterfalls. Halfway up the climb via the Kuhflucht Falls lies the Fricken Cave. Hiking time in each case is about 4 hours.

Since the re-opening of the Farchant railway halt in December 2010 the Munich–Garmisch-Partenkirchen railway once again offers suitable crossing route options, e. g. Farchant – Hoher Fricken – Esterbergalm – Partenkirchen or Farchant – Hoher Fricken – Oberau.

Gallery

References 

Mountains of Bavaria
Bavarian Prealps
Mountains of the Alps